Smile Again may refer to:

 Smile Again (2006 TV series)
 Smile Again (2010 TV series)
 "Smile Again", a song by Usher from the album Usher
 "Smile Again", a song by 9nine
 "Rescue Me/Smile Again", a song by Every Little Thing